Jack Owens (born 4 October 1995) is an Irish former rugby union player, who last played for Pro14 and European Rugby Champions Cup side Ulster in the 2018-19 season. He played as a wing or fullback.

Ulster
Owens made his senior Ulster debut on 18 February 2017 in round 15 of the 2016–17 Pro12, featuring off the bench in the provinces 37–17 win against Scottish side Glasgow Warriors.

References

External links
Ulster Profile
Pro14 Profile

1994 births
Living people
Rugby union players from Belfast
Irish rugby union players
Ulster Rugby players
Rugby union centres
Rugby union wings